William Robert FitzSimons (26 November 1870 – 20 March 1926) was an Irish-born Australian politician.

He was born at Greencastle in County Donegal to constable Samuel FitzSimons and Isabella, née McCloy. He arrived in New South Wales around 1886 and began studying dentistry. He married Bessie Amy Love, with whom he had two children. He practised as a dentist in Elizabeth and Macquarie Streets from 1905 to 1926, and also served on Kuringai Shire Council from 1911 to 1922 (president 1917–21). In 1922 he was elected to the New South Wales Legislative Assembly as a Nationalist member for Cumberland, serving until his death in Sydney in 1926.

References

 

1870 births
1926 deaths
Nationalist Party of Australia members of the Parliament of New South Wales
Members of the New South Wales Legislative Assembly
Irish emigrants to colonial Australia
Politicians from County Donegal
Australian dentists
Shire Presidents and Mayors of Ku-ring-gai
Politicians from Sydney